Ann Eleonora Jørgensen (born 16 October 1965) is a Danish film, television, and stage actress.

She is best known for her television work in Taxa (1997–1999) and The Killing (2007), and for her film roles in Italian for Beginners (2000), for which she won a Robert Award as Best Supporting Actress, and In Your Hands (2004), which netted her an audience award at the Bordeaux International Festival of Women in Cinema.

Jørgensen has also starred in numerous theatrical performances in some of Denmark's leading theatres, including Mungo Park, Avenue T, and Grønnegårds Teatret. When she is not filming, Jørgensen is an active member of the touring company Det Danske Teater.

The actress most recently appeared in the Netflix Christmas horror series Elves.

Selected filmography

Film

Television

References

External links
 
 Ann Eleonora Jørgensen at the Danish Film Institute

1965 births
Danish film actresses
Danish television actresses
Danish stage actresses
People from Hjørring
Living people